KLYD (98.9 FM) is a commercial radio station located in Snyder, Texas, broadcasting to the Big Spring-Snyder, Texas, area.  KLYD airs a modern rock music format. The call letters were previously held by KISV and KLHC in Bakersfield, California.

External links

LYD
Modern rock radio stations in the United States
Radio stations established in 2003